Al-Mustansir, more fully al-Mustansir billah, is a Muslim regnal surname and may refer to:

The regnal title was used by:
 Ma'ad al-Mustansir Billah (1029–1094), eighth Fatimid Imam-Caliph
 Al-Mustansir Billah II (r. 1463/4–1480), 32nd Nizari imam
 Al-Mustansir Billah III (r. 1493/4–1498), 34th Nizari imam
 Sayf al-Dawla ibn Hud al-Mustansir (r. 1145–1146), Muslim ruler of Valencia and Murcia
 Al-Mustansir I (1192–1242), penultimate Abbasid caliph in Baghdad from 1226 to 1242
 Al-Mustansir II (died 1262), first Abbasid caliph of Cairo for the Mamluk Sultanate between 1261 and 1262
 Muhammad I al-Mustansir (1228–1277), Hafsid ruler of North Africa and self-declared Caliph
 Abu Faris Abd al-Aziz I of Morocco (r. 1366–1372), Marinid sultan of Morocco
 Abu'l-Abbas Ahmad al-Mustansir (r. 1374–1384, 1387–1393), Marinid sultan of Morocco
 Ghabdula Chelbir Mustansir (r. 1178–1225) was the last ruler of Volga Bulgaria

See also
 Al-Mustansiriya University, Baghdad